The murder of George Floyd on May 25, 2020 triggered a wave of protests throughout Tennessee in late May and early June 2020.

Locations

Bristol 
On June 1, about 200 people held a candlelight vigil for George Floyd on State Street in both Bristol, Tennessee and Bristol, Virginia. The protests were largely peacefully held across the Tri-Cities region of Southwest Virginia and East Tennessee.

Chattanooga 
Hundreds protested at Miller Park followed by a march across the Walnut Street Bridge at mid-day on May 30. On May 31, protesters marched from Coolidge Park to the Hamilton County Courthouse. After protesters removed some light fixtures and tore down a flag near the courthouse, the National Guard, the Tennessee Highway Patrol and Chattanooga Police Department began arresting people and dispersing the crowds with tear gas. On June 3, during the fifth day of peaceful protests, police arrested a man standing on a rooftop along the route of the march with multiple firearms including an AK-47 and six beers.

Clarksville 
On May 30, over 200 participated in a protest in Clarksville that shut down a major highway but remained peaceful.

Cleveland 
Dozens protested in downtown Cleveland in front of the Bradley County courthouse and headquarters of the Cleveland Police Department on May 31. The protest was peaceful, and included protesters discussing police brutality issues with local law enforcement.

Jackson 
Almost 200 protestors showed up to protest peacefully at Jackson City Hall on May 30.

Johnson City 
Hundreds of protesters gathered in Johnson City for several days on May 31. Several arrests were made.

Knoxville 
Hundreds of protesters demonstrated on May 29 in front of police headquarters and then marched through downtown Knoxville.

Memphis
Silent demonstrations of around 40 people protesting the murder of Floyd, the death of Breonna Taylor in Kentucky, and the murder of Ahmaud Arbery, led to "verbal confrontations" with Memphis police and two counter-protesters from the Facebook group Confederate 901. On May 27, protesters shut down Union Avenue near McLean Boulevard. Just after midnight Saturday night, police in riot gear clashed with a large crowd on Beale Street. Shelby County Commissioner Tami Sawyer, who was on scene, tweeted: "Memphis police have threatened to use lethal force if we don't leave the parking lot. They have arrested our friends. We're not leaving." On Sunday Evening May 31, the fifth straight day of protests, more riot police attempted to disperse a crowd of 100 that were occupying Main Street. A curfew went into effect in Memphis, TN, on Monday, June 1, from 22:00 to 06:00, and was extended the following day to June 8.

Morristown 
On May 30, a group of around 150 protesters gathered at 9 p.m. and peacefully marched up and down Morristown's Main Street District, chanting phrases such as “I can't breathe” and “no justice, no peace.” No buildings or property in the downtown area were damaged. One counter-protester with a thin blue line flag was struck in the face and taken away by ambulance. The protesters blocked off the parking garage to the city center at around 11 p.m. where a line of police officers were stationed. The protesters threw small rocks and water bottles at the officers' feet and were ordered to disperse around 12:40 a.m. One man was arrested on June 3 for allegedly assaulting the counter-protester during the protest, as well as for felony evading arrest and reckless endangerment. The man had escaped a police chase on June 1 and fled to Arkansas.

Murfreesboro 
On May 31, a group of around 50 protesters marched toward a building on the Middle Tennessee State University campus named after Ku Klux Klan leader Nathan Bedford Forrest but were stopped by police in armored vehicles. Police accused protesters of vandalizing an armored car and throwing a brick through the window of a local business. A 12-year-old girl was injured by tear gas. Mayor Shane McFarland issued a state of emergency order. A curfew was in effect as of 6:30 pm. Earlier in the day, a peaceful vigil was held at the Rutherford County Courthouse with hundreds of participants.

Nashville 

On May 30, thousands gathered for a protest in downtown Nashville, the capital of Tennessee; protesters peacefully demonstrated in Legislative Plaza and then marched to a police department. In the evening, the crowd damaged a police car, threw rocks and sprayed graffiti; at least 5 were arrested. Mayor John Cooper declared a state of emergency and called in the national guard after a spate of arsons, including the burning of Nashville's courthouse.

The Nashville Autonomous Zone, sometimes referred to as the Ida B. Wells Plaza, was an attempt to declare an autonomous zone on the Capitol grounds of Nashville, Tennessee. It was an attempt to mirror the Capitol Hill Autonomous Zone of Seattle, though this "zone" never actually formed and was more of an occupational protest of the Tennessee State Capitol. On June 12 local activists called for protesters to occupy the Capitol grounds, starting at 5:00 p.m. local time. Fliers circulated by organizers demanded "Fire Chief Anderson. Defund the Police. Demilitarize the Police. Remove Racist Statues." In the wake of Occupy Wall Street the Tennessee State Legislature passed law making the occupation of State land after 10:00 p.m. a Class A misdemeanor.

Aftermath
In August 2020, Tennessee Governor Bill Lee signed legislation in response to the protests that made it a felony to participate in certain types of protest. Under the legislation, camping on state property is punishable by six years' imprisonment and the loss of the right to vote. Tennessee was the first state to pass anti-protest legislation in response to the George Floyd protests.

References

External links 
WBIR: Video of protesters marching in Morristown (31 May 2020)

2020 in Tennessee
Riots and civil disorder in Tennessee
Tennessee
May 2020 events in the United States
June 2020 events in the United States